Brian John McKechnie (born 6 November 1953) is a former "double All Black" - representing New Zealand in both rugby union and cricket.

Rugby career
He played 26 matches for the All Blacks as a first five-eighth and fullback, most memorably being the player to kick the winning penalty goal against Wales in 1978 when Andy Haden dived out off a lineout near full-time and was apparently awarded a penalty (the referee later said the penalty was for a completely separate incident and was clearly visible in video footage) which would secure the "Grand Slam" for the All Blacks against the home country unions.

Cricketing career
As a cricketer, McKechnie was an economical right-arm pace bowler and useful lower-order batsman who played 14 one day games for the Black Caps, including the 1975 and 1979 World Cup tournaments in England. His last match for New Zealand was the infamous "underarm match" against Australia in 1981, when McKechnie was the batsman who faced Trevor Chappell's underarm delivery in the final ball of the match, throwing his bat away in rage after blocking the delivery. McKechnie represented Otago in domestic competitions from 1971–72 to 1985–86. He later served on the national selection panel.

Beyond sports
With Lynn McConnell, he wrote McKechnie: Double All Black: An Autobiography (Craigs, Invercargill) in 1983.

References

External links

1953 births
New Zealand international rugby union players
Cricketers at the 1975 Cricket World Cup
Cricketers at the 1979 Cricket World Cup
People educated at Southland Boys' High School
Living people
New Zealand rugby union players
New Zealand cricketers
New Zealand One Day International cricketers
Otago cricketers
Southland cricketers
People from Gore, New Zealand
Southland rugby union players
Rugby union fullbacks
Rugby union players from Southland, New Zealand